Chieut (character: ㅊ) is a consonant of the Korean hangul alphabet. The Unicode for ㅊ is U+314A. Its IPA pronunciation is [tʃh] but at the end of a syllable it is pronounced [t] unless followed by a vowel. For example: 김치 kimchi, but 꽃 kkot ("flower").

Stroke order

References 

Hangul jamo